The Recession 2 is the twelfth studio album by American rapper Jeezy. The album was released on November 20, 2020, by YJ Music, Inc., CTE and Def Jam Recordings. It serves as a sequel to his third album The Recession (2008). The album features guest appearances from Tamika Mallory, Yo Gotti, E-40, Demi Lovato, Lil Duval, Ne-Yo and Rick Ross.

Track listing

Charts

References

2020 albums
Jeezy albums
Def Jam Recordings albums
Sequel albums